This is a comprehensive list of victories of the  cycling team. The races are categorized according to the UCI Continental Circuits rules.

2017: Bahrain–Merida

Stage 3 (ITT) Vuelta a San Juan, Ramūnas Navardauskas
Stage 2 Paris–Nice, Sonny Colbrelli
Brabantse Pijl, Sonny Colbrelli
 Overall Tour of Croatia, Vincenzo Nibali
Stage 16 Giro d'Italia, Vincenzo Nibali
Stage 8 Tour of Japan, Jon Ander Insausti
 National Time Trial Championships, Tsgabu Grmay
Stage 3 Vuelta a España, Vincenzo Nibali
Giro dell'Emilia, Giovanni Visconti
Giro di Lombardia, Vincenzo Nibali

2018: Bahrain–Merida

Stage 4 Dubai Tour, Sonny Colbrelli
GP Industria & Artigianato, Matej Mohorič
Milan–San Remo, Vincenzo Nibali
 Overall Tour of Croatia, Kanstantsin Siutsou
Stage 1, Niccolò Bonifazio
Stage 3, Kanstantsin Siutsou
Stage 5, Manuele Boaro
Stage 5 Tour of the Alps, Mark Padun
Stage 10 Giro d'Italia, Matej Mohorič
Stages 3 & 7 Tour of Japan, Grega Bole
Stage 1 Hammer Sportzone Limburg
Gran Premio di Lugano, Hermann Pernsteiner
Stage 3 Tour de Suisse, Sonny Colbrelli
 National Road Race Championships, Gorka Izagirre
 National Road Race Championships, Matej Mohorič
Stage 1 Tour of Austria, Matej Mohorič
Stages 2, 4 & 8 Tour of Austria, Giovanni Visconti
Stage 7 Tour of Austria, Antonio Nibali
 Overall BinckBank Tour, Matej Mohorič
 Overall Deutschland Tour, Matej Mohorič
Stage 3, Matej Mohorič
Coppa Bernocchi, Sonny Colbrelli
Gran Piemonte, Sonny Colbrelli

2019: Bahrain–Merida

Stage 4 Tour of Oman, Sonny Colbrelli
Prologue Tour de Romandie, Jan Tratnik
Stage 5 Tour of California, Iván García Cortina
Stage 2 Critérium du Dauphiné, Dylan Teuns 
Stage 1 (ITT) Tour de Suisse, Rohan Dennis
 National Time Trial Championships, Chun Kai Feng
 National Time Trial Championships, Mark Padun
 National Road Race Championships, Domen Novak
Stage 6 Tour de France, Dylan Teuns 
Stage 20 Tour de France, Vincenzo Nibali
 Overall Adriatica Ionica Race, Mark Padun
Stage 2, Mark Padun
Stage 7 Tour de Pologne, Matej Mohorič
Stage 4 Deutschland Tour, Sonny Colbrelli
Coppa Bernocchi, Phil Bauhaus
Gran Premio Bruno Beghelli, Sonny Colbrelli

2020: Bahrain–McLaren

 Overall Saudi Tour, Phil Bauhaus
Stages 3 & 5, Phil Bauhaus 
Stage 5 (ITT) Vuelta a Andalucía, Dylan Teuns 
Stage 3 Paris–Nice, Iván García Cortina
Circuito de Getxo, Damiano Caruso
Stage 2 Route d'Occitanie, Sonny Colbrelli
 National Time Trial Championships, Pello Bilbao
Stage 16 Giro d'Italia, Jan Tratnik

2021: Team Bahrain Victorious

Stage 4 Tour de la Provence, Phil Bauhaus
Stage 4 Tour of the Alps, Pello Bilbao
Stage 2 Tour de Romandie, Sonny Colbrelli
Stages 1 & 3 Tour de Hongrie, Phil Bauhaus
Stage 6 Giro d'Italia, Gino Mäder
Stage 20 Giro d'Italia, Damiano Caruso
Stage 3 Critérium du Dauphiné, Sonny Colbrelli 
Stages 7 & 8 Critérium du Dauphiné, Mark Padun
Stages 1 & 5 Tour of Slovenia, Phil Bauhaus
Stage 8 Tour de Suisse, Gino Mäder
 National Time Trial Championships, Jan Tratnik
 National Road Race Championships, Sonny Colbrelli 
 National Road Race Championships, Matej Mohorič
Stages 7 & 19 Tour de France, Matej Mohorič
Stage 8 Tour de France, Dylan Teuns
 Overall Vuelta a Burgos, Mikel Landa
Stage 1 Tour de Pologne, Phil Bauhaus
 Young rider classification Vuelta a España, Gino Mäder
Stage 9, Damiano Caruso
Overall  Benelux Tour, Sonny Colbrelli
Stage 6, Sonny Colbrelli 
Stage 7, Matej Mohorič
 UEC European Road Championships, Sonny Colbrelli
Memorial Marco Pantani, Sonny Colbrelli
 Overall CRO Race
Stage 1, Phil Bauhaus
Stage 5, Stephen Williams
Paris–Roubaix, Sonny Colbrelli

2022: Team Bahrain Victorious

Stage 2 Saudi Tour, Santiago Buitrago
 Overall Vuelta a Andalucía, Wout Poels
Stage 4, Wout Poels
Stage 7 Tirreno–Adriatico, Phil Bauhaus
Milan–San Remo, Matej Mohorič
Stage 3 Tour of the Basque Country, Pello Bilbao 
Stage 2 Tour of the Alps, Pello Bilbao
La Flèche Wallonne, Dylan Teuns
Stage 1 Tour de Romandie, Dylan Teuns
Stage 17 Giro d'Italia, Santiago Buitrago
Stage 1 Tour de Suisse, Stephen Williams
 National Time Trial Championships, Jan Tratnik
 National Road Race Championships, Yukiya Arashiro
Stage 1 Vuelta a Burgos, Santiago Buitrago
Stage 5 Tour de Pologne, Phil Bauhaus
Stage 4 Vuelta a Burgos, Matevž Govekar
Stage 4 Deutschland Tour, Pello Bilbao
 Overall CRO Race, Matej Mohorič
Stages 1 & 2, Jonathan Milan

2023: Team Bahrain Victorious

Stage 1 Tour Down Under, Phil Bauhaus
Stage 3 Tour Down Under, Pello Bilbao
Stage 2 Saudi Tour, Jonathan Milan

Supplementary statistics
Sources

Notes

References

wins
Cycling teams established in 2017
Cycling teams based in Bahrain
2017 establishments in Bahrain
BAH